Zarcone is an Italian surname. Notable people with the surname include:

Luigi Zarcone (1950–2001), Italian middle and long-distance runner
Marley Zarcone (born 1983), Canadian comics artist

See also
Sarcone

Italian-language surnames